Fuencarral is a neighborhood located in the northern part of Madrid, Spain. It includes the municipal area of the ancient town of Fuencarral, which was annexed to the city of Madrid by a decree of November 10, 1950. Administratively, Fuencarral belongs to the municipal district of Valverde in the district of Fuencarral-El Pardo.

Images Gallery

External links 
Fuencarral in Google Maps

Neighbourhoods of Madrid
Former municipalities in Spain